Višegrad is a town and municipality in Republika Srpska, Bosnia and Herzegovina.

Višegrad may also refer to fortresses:
 Višegrad (Bistrički), a fortress on the river Bistrica, in which the monastery of the Holy Archangels is located next to Prizren
 , a fortress on the river Nišava near Sićevo

See also 
 Visegrad (disambiguation)